Joseph Kuch (born 24 September 2000) is a South Sudanese footballer who plays as a forward for Amarat United and the South Sudan national team.

Club career
Kuch signed with Real Black FC of the South Sudan Football Championship in 2014. In his first and only season with the club he made 26 league appearances, scoring 15 goals. His performances attracted interest from Amarat United, also of the South Sudan Football Championship, and he joined the club the following season.  In December 2020 Kuch was linked with a move to the Israeli Premier League. In July 2020, he was in talks to join Gor Mahia F.C. of the Kenyan Premier League but the deal did not materialize. Later that month he was also offered contracts from several clubs in Slovakia but air travel and visa restrictions caused by the COVID-19 pandemic made the move impossible. He departed Amarat United at the end of December 2020. At that time it was expected that he would sign for a club in East Asia. Kuch scored 48 combined league goals for the 2019 and 2020 seasons with the club.

International career
Kuch represented South Sudan during 2019 Africa U-23 Cup of Nations qualification before the team was eliminated by Tunisia in the second round. He made his senior international debut on 22 April 2017 in a 2018 African Nations Championship qualification match against Somalia.

International goals
Scores and results list South Sudan's goal tally first.

International statistics

References

External links
Soccerway profile
National Football Teams profile

Living people
South Sudanese footballers
South Sudan international footballers
Association football forwards
2000 births